Jason Joseph Connery (born 11 January 1963) is a British actor and director. He is the son of Sean Connery and Diane Cilento. On screen, he is best known for appearing in the third series of the ITV drama series Robin of Sherwood in 1986. He took over the main role after Michael Praed's character was killed off at the end of the second series.

Early life
Connery was born in Rome and raised in London. He is the son of Australian actress Diane Cilento and Scottish actor Sean Connery. He attended Millfield School, a co-educational private school in the town of Street, in Somerset, England, and later the independent Gordonstoun School in Moray, Scotland. He was later accepted into the Bristol Old Vic Theatre School.

Career
Connery performed many roles in theatre and subsequently had parts in several B-films. His film début was in The Lords of Discipline (1983). He appeared in the Doctor Who serial Vengeance on Varos in 1985. He also portrayed Robin Hood in the final series of the television series Robin of Sherwood in 1986.

He later portrayed James Bond creator Ian Fleming in the 1990 television drama Spymaker: The Secret Life of Ian Fleming.  In 1997, he appeared in a fantasy film (originally intended as a pilot episode for a longer series) playing the title role of Merlin in Merlin: The Quest Begins, directed by David Winning. He appeared in Faithful Dealing (2001) in London, an English Restoration Whodunit, produced by Dominic Madden. In 2003, he toured with a stage production of The Blue Room. In 2004 he was a main character in the children's show Shoebox Zoo and returned in the second series in September 2005.

Connery had starring roles in several horror films, including Lightspeed (2006), Night Skies (2007) and Brotherhood of Blood (2007).

In 2014 he took part in BBC One's Celebrity MasterChef and featured in the sitcom George Lopez (2002).

Directing
In 2008 he made his directorial début with the film Pandemic and in 2009 directed The Devil's Tomb. Connery directed the 2011 "After Dark Originals" film 51, and The Philly Kid (2012) for the "After Dark Action" series.

In 2016, Connery directed Tommy's Honour, a film celebrating the lives of golf pioneers Old Tom Morris and Young Tom Morris. The film opened the 2016 Edinburgh International Film Festival on 15 June 2016, and won Best Feature Film at the 2016 British Academy Scotland Awards.

Personal life
Connery met American actress Mia Sara during the making of Bullet to Beijing in Russia. They married in 1996, and their son, Dashiell Quinn Connery, was born in June 1997. The couple divorced in 2002.

In April 2021, he married Fiona Ufton, his girlfriend of five years.

Filmography

Acting

References

External links

1963 births
Alumni of Bristol Old Vic Theatre School
English male video game actors
English male voice actors
English male television actors
English male film actors
English people of Australian descent
English people of Irish descent
English people of Italian descent
English people of Scottish descent
Living people
Male actors from London
People educated at Ibstock Place School
People educated at Millfield
People educated at Gordonstoun
People educated at Millfield Preparatory School
People from Marylebone